Charles Raymond Demmitt (February 2, 1884 – February 19, 1956) was a professional baseball player who played outfielder in the Major Leagues from - for the New York Highlanders, St. Louis Browns, Detroit Tigers, and Chicago White Sox.

Demmitt was born in Illiopolis, Illinois and died in Glen Ellyn, Illinois. He went to college at University of Illinois at Urbana-Champaign and Rose–Hulman Institute of Technology.

External links

1884 births
1956 deaths
Major League Baseball outfielders
New York Highlanders players
St. Louis Browns players
Detroit Tigers players
Chicago White Sox players
Baltimore Orioles (IL) players
Newark Indians players
Montreal Royals players
Toronto Maple Leafs (International League) players
Jersey City Skeeters players
Columbus Senators players
Baseball players from Illinois
People from Glen Ellyn, Illinois